Phraates II (also spelled Frahad II;  Frahāt) was king of the Parthian Empire from 132 BC to 127 BC. He was the son and successor of Mithridates I. 

Because he was still very young when he came to the throne, his mother Rinnu initially ruled on his behalf. His short reign was mainly marked by his war with the Greek Seleucid Empire, who under king Antiochus VII Sidetes attempted to regain the lands lost to Phraates' father. Initially unsuccessful in the conflict, Phraates II managed to gain the upper hand and defeated Antiochus VII's forces, with the Seleucid himself dying in battle or committing suicide. Phraates II afterwards rushed to the east to repel an invasion by nomadic tribes—the Saka and Yuezhi, where he met his end. He was succeeded by his uncle Artabanus I.

Name 
Phraátēs is the Greek form of the Parthian Frahāt (𐭐𐭓𐭇𐭕), itself from the Old Iranian *Frahāta- ("gained, earned"). The Modern Persian version is Farhād.

Background 

Early reign and policy 
Phraates succeeded his father in 132 BC; due to still being a minor, his mother ruled with him for a few months. Around this period, Phraates gave Darayan I kingship over the southern Iranian region of Persis. Furthermore, he also defeated and captured the Elymais ruler Tigraios and appointed Kamnaskires the Younger on the Elymais throne as a Parthian vassal. Continuing his fathers plan, Phraates II had intentions to conquer Syria, and planned to use his captive—the former Seleucid king (basileus) Demetrius II Nicator—as an instrument against his brother—the new Seleucid king Antiochus VII Sidetes. According to the 2nd-century Roman historian Justin, Demetrius attempted to escape captivity twice, both times during the reign of Phraates. The first attempt occurred after Mithridates I's death, with the second attempt happening a few years after;

War with Antiochus VII 

Antiochus, well-aware of Phraates II's plans to use his brother against him, invaded the Parthian realm in 130 BC to thwart it. He was reportedly well-received by many magnates, who joined him. After three battles he reclaimed Babylonia. At the same time, the eastern Parthian frontier was invaded by nomads. Antiochus' forces wintered in Parthian territory; before spring, he entered into negotiations with Phraates II. Self-confident after his victories, Antiochus demanded not only the release of Demetrius, but also the return of the all lost lands and renewal of tribute fees. Phraates II, offended by the reply, broke off the negotiations and prepared for battle. 

Whilst wintering, Antiochus VII quartered himself and his army in Ecbatana, where he completely alienated the local people by forcing them to pay for the upkeep of his soldiers and because, it seems, the soldiers assaulted the locals. Thus, when Phraates II attacked the Seleucid army in its winter quarters during the spring of 129 BC, the local population supported him. Antiochus was defeated and died, either in battle or by committing suicide, ending Seleucid rule east of the Euphrates. Phraates, relishing over the death of Antiochus, is reported to have said the following before the latter's corpse; "Your boldness and drunkenness, Antiochus, caused your fall; for you expected to drink up the kingdom of Arsaces in huge cups." 

Phraates II succeeded in capturing Seleucus and Laodice, two of Antiochus' children who had accompanied their father on campaign. Phraates II later married Laodice and showed Seleucus (not to be confused with his cousin Seleucus V) great favour. He allowed Antiochus a royal funeral and later returned the body to Syria in a silver coffin along with Seleucus. Phraates II also released Demetrius, who had been held by the Parthians as a hostage for several years, to become king of the Seleucid realm for a second time.

Syria, which was now all that was left of the Seleucid empire, lacked military power and Phraates II apparently planned to invade it. However, on the eastern front, various nomadic tribes already infiltrating and usurping the Saka and Tokhari destroyed the Greco-Bactrian Kingdom, penetrated to the borders of the realm in 129 BC, and threatened the Parthian realm. The king had to rush to the eastern front, installing Himeros as governor of Babylon, who quickly became a tyrant. Phraates II marched east, his army including a large force of captured Seleucid soldiers from the army of the late Antiochus. These soldiers ultimately refused to fight for the Parthian king, and he was defeated and killed in battle.

Coinage and Imperial ideology 

Phraates refrained from using the title of "King of Kings" in his coinage, and instead used the title of "great king". Like the rest of the Parthian kings, he used the title of Arsaces on his coinage, which was the name of the first Parthian ruler Arsaces I, which had become a royal honorific among the Parthian monarchs out of admiration for his achievements. 

Furthermore, he also used the title of Philhellene ("friend of the Greeks"), which had been introduced during the reign of his father Mithridates I as a political act in order to establish friendly relations with their Greek subjects. An unusual title attested during the reign of Phraates was the title of "King of the Lands" (attested in Babylonian cuneiform tablets as šar mātāti), which was rarely used by the Seleucid monarchs. Like his father, Phraates is wearing a Hellenistic diadem, whilst his beard represents the traditional Iranian/Near Eastern custom.

References

Bibliography

Ancient works 
Justin, Epitome of the Philippic History of Pompeius Trogus.

Modern works

Further reading
 Overtoom, N. L. (2021). The Parthians’ Failed Vassalage of Syria: The Shortsighted Western Policy of Phraates II and the Second Reign of Demetrius II (129–125 BCE), Acta Antiqua Academiae Scientiarum Hungaricae, 60(1-2), 1-14. Retrieved Mar 16, 2022, from https://akjournals.com/view/journals/068/60/1-2/article-p1.xml

127 BC deaths
2nd-century BC Parthian monarchs
2nd-century BC rulers in Asia
Year of birth unknown
Monarchs killed in action
2nd-century BC Iranian people
2nd-century BC Babylonian kings
Kings of the Lands